Logan Square was an elevated station on the Chicago Transit Authority's 'L' system, serving the Logan Square branch and the Logan Square neighborhood.

History 

The elevated station was opened in 1895 as part of an extension of the Metropolitan West Side Elevated line. The older Logan Square station was the terminal of the West-Northwest Route (the predecessor to the Blue Line) until 1970 when the line was rerouted and extended via the Kennedy Expressway to Jefferson Park. The elevated station was later demolished after a replacement subway station, also called Logan Square, opened.

Station details

Operations and connections
Streetcars replaced cable cars on Milwaukee Avenue between Lawrence and downtown on August 19, 1906. An extension route from Lawrence to Imlay, near the Forest Preserve, opened on December 11, 1914, and the lines were through-routed on October 1, 1927. Streetcars were typically one car each in Chicago; two-car multiple-unit control trains ran on Milwaukee Avenue between March 2, 1925 and May 5, 1929. As of 1928, the line had owl service between 1:05 and 5:35 a.m., wherein cars to Devon Avenue ran every 15 minutes and cars to Gale Street ran every 30 minutes; during the day, streetcars in Chicago typically had intervals of eight to fifteen minutes. Buses replaced streetcars on weekends on October 28, 1951, and altogether on May 11, 1952.

Starting on December 31, 1915, streetcars on "Through Route 17" (T.R. 17), a route that stretched from 67th Street up to Foster Avenue and switched between Kedzie and California Avenues, began to use Milwaukee Avenue rather than Elston farther north to make this switch. As of 1928, T.R. 17 had owl service between 1 and 4:30 a.m., with night cars running every 15 minutes; all cars went between 47th and Kedzie and California and Milwaukee, and alternating between going up to Roscoe and California or Bryn Mawr and Kedzie on the north end, and 47th and Kedzie or 67th and Kedzie at the south end. The Kedzie-Homan bus replaced T.R. 17 streetcars on December 4, 1949, but local streetcars continued on weekends until May 11, 1952, and on weekdays until May 29, 1954.

References

Works cited

External links 

 Logan Square Station Page

1895 establishments in Illinois
1970 disestablishments in Illinois
Defunct Chicago "L" stations
Railway stations in the United States opened in 1895
Railway stations closed in 1970
Railway stations in Chicago